Charles Peter Allen (2 December 1861 – 18 September 1930) was an English Liberal politician who represented Stroud from 1900 to 1918. His professional career was as a solicitor and newspaper journalist. He served his country during World War I, as a major in the Gloucestershire Regiment, and as a sportsman played international rugby for Wales.

Personal history
Charles Peter Allen was born in 1861 in Prestwich, Lancashire to Peter Allen, the manager of the Manchester Guardian and part owner of the Manchester Evening News. In 1865 the family moved to Beaumaris on the Isle of Anglesey in Wales, when they rented a property. The family purchased a house in the town in 1873. Allen was educated at Rugby School, before matriculating to Oxford University. On leaving university he was articled to a firm of Manchester solicitors, and qualified as a barrister, though by 1887 he had changed careers and became a journalist for the Manchester Guardian. He was assigned as a foreign correspondent and was sent to Russia, Bulgaria and Turkey. While in Constantinople he met Evelina Barker and the two were married in the city in 1890, before returning to live in Beaumaris. They had five children, four daughters and a son.

In 1900 he became Member of Parliament for Stroud, and he and his family moved to the area. While an MP, Allen was made a Privy Councillor, and was appointed a deputy lieutenant of Gloucestershire in 1911. He retained his position as MP until 1918. Allen had been a member of the 5th Battalion, Gloucestershire Regiment in the Territorial Force prior to the outbreak of war, and at the age of 53 he became a full-time soldier, helping to raise the 2/5th Gloucesters. Posted to France as a captain, he became a Town Major, dealing with troop movements. At the end of his military career, Allen had reached the rank of major. In 1922 he ran again for the Parliamentary seat of Stroud, but was beaten. He died at his London home in 1930.

Rugby career
Allen first came to note as a rugby player when he was selected for Oxford University RFC, though he had also represented Rugby School as a youth. Allen played in three Varsity Matches against Cambridge University, winning three sporting 'Blues' from 1881 to 1883. In 1884, Allen was selected to play for Wales in the opening match of the Home Nations Championship against his birth country, England. Under the captaincy of Charlie Newman, Wales lost by a goal to a goal and two tries, though it was Allen who scored the only Welsh try, the first points the Welsh team had ever scored against the English. Allen was reselected for the next game of the tournament, in a home game to Scotland. Wales lost the game, and Allen was replaced for the final game by Cardiff's William Norton.

International matches played
Wales
  1884
  1884

References

Bibliography
 Capt A.F. Barnes, The Story of the 2/5th Battalion Gloucestershire Regiment 1914–1918, Gloucester: Crypt House Press 1930/Uckfield: Naval & Military, 2003, .

External links 
 

1861 births
1930 deaths
Alumni of University College, Oxford
British Army personnel of World War I
British barristers
British sportsperson-politicians
Deputy Lieutenants of Gloucestershire
English male journalists
English rugby union players
Gloucestershire Regiment officers
Liberal Party (UK) MPs for English constituencies
Members of the Privy Council of the United Kingdom
Oxford University RFC players
People educated at Rugby School
People from Prestwich
Rugby union players from Greater Manchester
The Guardian journalists
UK MPs 1900–1906
UK MPs 1906–1910
UK MPs 1910
UK MPs 1910–1918
Wales international rugby union players
Manchester Rugby Club players